Colors was a 70-seat restaurant in the Lower East Side of Manhattan, New York City.

The September 11 attacks on the World Trade Center destroyed the popular Windows on the World restaurant, and, when many of its former workers remained unemployed a non-profit started a restaurant named Colors to employ them, while upgrading their skills.

2006-2017

Former employees of the Windows on the World restaurant opened Colors in 2006, with the support of the non-profit Restaurant Opportunities Center.  The restaurant closed its original location in 2017.  The New York Times, and other publications, reported that ROC had problems fulfilling its ideals of worker empowerment, reporting difficulties like workers quitting over not being paid on time.

2019 reopening

Celebrated Cordon Bleu chef Sicily Sewell was hired to oversee the kitchen in a re-opened Colors in the fall of 2019.  When the newly reopened restaurant was shutdown one month later Sewell was critical of management, who had failed to inform employees that they saw the reopening as a "test run".

References

2019 establishments in New York City
2010s in Manhattan
Lower East Side
Restaurants established in 2019
Restaurants in Manhattan